Měcholupy is a market town in Louny District in the Ústí nad Labem Region of the Czech Republic. It has about 1,000 inhabitants.

Administrative parts
Villages of Milošice, Velká Černoc and Želeč are administrative parts of Měcholupy.

Geography
The northern part of the municipal territory lies in the Most Basin. The market town is situated on the Blšanka river.

History

The first written mention of Měcholupy is from 1295. Among the owners of the village were King Vladislaus II of Hungary, the Sekera od Sedčice family, and members of the dynasties of Kolowrat and Lobkowicz. At the end of the 17th century, during the rule of Karl of Paar, the local fortress was rebuilt into a Baroque castle with a chapel.

In 1860, Anton Dreher bought Měcholupy, established a new brewery and had rebuilt the castle into its current appearance. The village was promoted to a market town in 1875. The Michelob beer brand of Anheuser-Busch was introduced in 1896 and was named after the German name of Měcholupy.

Sights
Today the Měcholupy Castle serves as a special school.

In the centre of Želeč there is a late Baroque castle and Baroque Church of Saint Nicholas.

The Church of Saint Wenceslaus in Velká Černoc was built in the Baroque style in 1783–1787.

References

External links

 

Market towns in the Czech Republic
Populated places in Louny District